Jennifer Jill "JJ" Ramberg was, until recently, the host of MSNBC's weekend business program Your Business, which aired Sunday mornings at 7:30 ET with repeats on the following Saturday at 5:30 a.m. Ramberg came to MSNBC from CNN.

Biography
Ramberg was born to a Jewish family the daughter of Constance "Connie" (née Rudow) and Max Ramberg. Her mother died in 2001. She comes from a long line of entrepreneurs. Her paternal grandfather
immigrated to the United States from Mexico first working as a peddler of pots and pans before opening a furniture store, a storage business, a document storage business, and a real estate firm; her father expanded the businesses. Her maternal grandfather founded numerous companies including a tropical fish company, a tire distribution company, and was the first person to bring frozen pizza to California. In 1988, her mother and brother, Ken, founded JOBTRAK,  a job listing and resume database for college students, which they sold to Monster.com in 2000.

Ramberg graduated cum laude from Duke University with a bachelor of arts degree in English, class of 1992, and holds her MBA from Stanford Business School. Ramberg and her brother Ken founded the charitable search engine GoodSearch in November 2005. She gave birth to her first child in early 2007.

Personal life
Ramberg is married to architect Scott Glass; the couple lives in Brooklyn with their three children.

References

External links

Year of birth missing (living people)
Living people
American business and financial journalists
CNN people
Duke University Trinity College of Arts and Sciences alumni
Jewish American journalists
MSNBC people
People from Brooklyn
Stanford Graduate School of Business alumni
Television personalities from New York City